SOR EBN 10,5 is electric bus made by Czech bus manufacturer SOR produced since 2010. Its development was initiated in late 2008 and 2009, with a supplier of electrical equipment, Cegelec, which further uses subcontractors.

Design  
Elektrobus is based on a city bus SOR BN 12, from which it took over from the chassis shortened by about 1.5 m rear overhang. The vehicle has two axles and three doors, its length is 10 370 mm and a width of 2 525 mm. Bus battery (180 lithium-ion cells with a total capacity of 300 Ah) lasts up to 110-180 kilometers away and recharges from the mains voltage of 400 volts. Battery of the bus can be recharged full cycle for 8 hours or shortened so. "Quick" for 4 hours. Recharging of the bus may take less time and can be modified even runway turn pads.

See also 

 List of buses

Buses of the Czech Republic
Buses manufactured by SOR